The 1955 All-Ireland Senior Hurling Championship was the 69th staging of the All-Ireland hurling championship since its establishment by the Gaelic Athletic Association in 1887. The championship began on 24 April 1955 and ended on 4 September 1955.

Cork were the defending champions, however, they were defeated in the provincial series. Wexford won the title following a 3-13 to 2-8 defeat of Galway in the final.

Teams

A total of fourteen teams contested the championship, the same as the previous championship, however, there were some changes on personnel. Antrim withdrew from the senior championship, while Wicklow fielded a team in the Leinster Senior Hurling Championship.

Team summaries

Results

Leinster Senior Hurling Championship

First round

Second round

Semi-finals

Finals

Munster Senior Hurling Championship

First round

Semi-finals

Final

All-Ireland Senior Hurling Championship

Semi-final

Final

Championship statistics

Scoring

Top scorers overall

Top scorers in a single game

Miscellaneous
 The attendance of 23,125 is one of the lowest attendances at a Munster final in recent years.
 The attendance of 50,840 at the game between Limerick and Wexford was a new record for an All-Ireland semi-final.
 Wexford win their second All-Ireland title, their first since 1910.

Sources
 Corry, Eoghan, The GAA Book of Lists (Hodder Headline Ireland, 2005).
 Donegan, Des, The Complete Handbook of Gaelic Games (DBA Publications Limited, 2005).

References

1955